Robert Hofferer (born 1959 in Klagenfurt) is an Austrian film and theatre producer and a cultural manager.

Career
After graduating from high school he earned a master's degree in Theater and Communication Science at the University of Vienna. After that, Robert Hofferer produced theater projects for groups in Graz and Vienna and organized exhibits and  performances for young artists. He also worked as a culture journalist for TV and Radio.

From 2002 until 2016, Robert Hofferer was  the manager of Andre Heller, who thanked him in his book Afrika! Afrika!. He was also the CEO of André Hellers company Artevent Ltd. and is still the owner and CEO of Artdeluxe Culture and Culture Management Ltd. which is based in Vienna. From 2006 – 2012, he was the manager of Asli Bayram; her international career was built up by him.

Until 2018, Robert Hofferer was a main sponsor of the Let’s Cee Film Festival and founder of the Urania Award in the categories Best Feature Film and Best Documentary and the Star of the Urania, a Lifetime Achievement Award. In 2013, he added to his activity  the Artdeluxe Award for the Best Short Film. Since 2019, Robert Hofferer is a member of the European Film Academy.

Films
 2007: Shortcut to Hollywood
 2009: Sevdah for Karim
 2011: Body Complete
 2014: The Woods are still Green
 2016: The Final Barrier
 2017: Das Wiener Riesenrad. Wahrzeichen und Legende
 2019: Gate to Heaven

Projects
Anne Frank: The Diary of a Young Girl (2007-2009, theater)
Afrika! Afrika! -  2006 - 2010 and  2013/14

References

External links

 https://www.imdb.com/title/tt9045740/
 https://www.youtube.com/watch?v=0lhm6paGM74
 
 Body Complete
 Artevent
 Der Tagesspiegel
 Kleine Zeitung
 http://www.letsceefilmfestival.com/awards-en.html
 http://www.wienerzeitung.at/nachrichten/wien/service/563439_Volles-Programm-fast-ohne-Geld.html
 http://www.letsceefilmfestival.com/festival-partner-en.html
 http://derstandard.at/1381368649152/Welttheater-ohne-Netz
 http://www.the-woods.com
 https://www.hollywoodreporter.com/review/woods-are-still-green-shanghai-714018
 https://www.europeanfilmacademy.org

1959 births
Austrian film producers
Austrian theatre managers and producers
Living people
Mass media people from Klagenfurt